The women's shot put event at the 2016 African Championships in Athletics was held on 26 June in Kings Park Stadium.

Results

References

2016 African Championships in Athletics
Shot put at the African Championships in Athletics
2016 in women's athletics